Justin Sukow (born September 19, 1998) is an American soccer player who currently plays for Richmond Kickers in the USL League One.

Career

Youth
Sukow played with local USSDA side Lonestar SC, where he was a team captain.

College & Amateur
Sukow attended the University of South Carolina in 2017 to play college soccer, where he went on to make 34 appearances, scoring 8 goals and tallying 3 assists over two seasons with the Gamecocks. During his time at South Carolina, Sukow was also named to the 2018 SEC Fall Academic Honor Roll, the 2017 C-USA Commissioner's Honor Roll, and the 2017 SEC First-Year Academic Honor Roll. Sukow transferred to Loyola University Chicago in 2019, where he scored 9 goals and got 5 assists in 20 appearances.  The season saw Sukow earn United Soccer Coaches Third Team All-West Region honors, as well as First Team All-Missouri Valley Conference. Loyola's 2020 season was cancelled due to the COVID-19 pandemic.

In 2018 and 2019, Sukow also played in the USL League Two with SC United Bantams and Chicago FC United respectively.

Professional
On September 15, 2020, Sukow signed with USL Championship side Reno 1868. Reno 1868 ceased operations as a club following their 2020 season.

On April 22, 2021, Sukow joined USL League One side Forward Madison. He made his professional debut on May 8, 2021, appearing as a 72nd-minute substitute during a 1–1 draw with FC Tucson.

On January 31, 2023, Sukow signed with USL League One side Richmond Kickers.

References

1998 births
Living people
American soccer players
Association football midfielders
South Carolina Gamecocks men's soccer players
Loyola Ramblers men's soccer players
SC United Bantams players
Chicago FC United players
Reno 1868 FC players
Forward Madison FC players
Richmond Kickers players
Soccer players from San Antonio
USL League One players
USL League Two players